St Peter, Vere Street,  known until 1832  as the Oxford Chapel  after its founder Edward Harley, 2nd Earl of Oxford and Earl Mortimer, is a former Anglican church off Oxford Street, London. It has sometimes been referred to as the Marybone Chapel or Marylebone Chapel.

History
The chapel was designed by James Gibbs in 1722.  It was originally intended as a Chapel of Ease to supplement the parish church for the growing parish of Marylebone.

It was licensed for marriages from 1722 to 1754 and between 1930 and its deconsecration: Margaret Bentinck (daughter of the 2nd Earl, and Duchess of Portland) married here. Incumbents included the theologian F. D. Maurice (1860–69), and William Boyce was the chapel's organist from 1734 to 1736. Its interior appears in plate 2 of Hogarth's print series Industry and Idleness. It was also here that the French chef Jassintour Rozea married his French wife Mary Magdalen Bernard in April 1744. They lived on Duke Street close to Grosvenor Square. He became Master Chef to the Duke of Somerset, Charles Seymour, presenting sumptuous banquets for his guests. He wrote several cookery books on gourmet French cooking in the 1750s.

In 1830, Parliament passed an "Act for endowing the Parish Church of Newborough in the County of Northampton, and Three Chapels, called Portland Chapel, Oxford Chapel, and Welbeck Chapel, situate in the Parish of Saint Mary-le-bone, in the County of Middlesex, and also a Chapel erected on Sunk Island in the River Humber".

It served the congregation of All Souls Church, Langham Place, from 1940 to 1951 whilst the latter was having war damage repaired, and then became a chapel of ease to it. It is now deconsecrated and houses the London Institute for Contemporary Christianity.

Architecture
The  church is built of brick, with stone quoins. The main entrance is at the west end, with steps leading up to a Doric porch. The pediment once held a carved coat of arms of a member of the De Vere family; this was removed in 1832, when the building was renovated and named St Peter's.  A  tower rises from the ridge of the 
roof at the west end; the first stage is square, and of brick, while the  second two stages are octagonal, and pierced on each side. At the east end is a Venetian window, with a pediment above. There was originally a stone vase on each corner of the building.

Gibbs published plans of the building in his Book Of Architecture, in which it is called 'Marybone Chapel'. Its ground plan was copied at St Paul's Church, Halifax, Nova Scotia, the earliest Anglican church in Canada, and the Holy Ghost plaque in the ceiling at St Thomas' Church, Stourbridge, is a close copy of that here.

References

Former Church of England church buildings
James Gibbs buildings
Grade I listed churches in the City of Westminster